Pecked curvilinear nucleated (PCN), in archaeology, is a form of prehistoric rock carving. The term was originally proposed by Teresa Miller and Reed Haslam in 1976 to describe a widespread type of rock carving in western North America. The form is characterized by a circular or oval groove element, which results in a raised center area. The form is quite prevalent in California and is applied to a number of Native American rock carving sites in this portion of the United States.

Examples
Occurrences of this type of rock carving can be found at Ring Mountain, Marin County, California, and in Lakeport, California.

See also
 Petroglyph
 Pictograph

Notes

References
 Ken Hedges and James E. Workman (1983) Rock Art Papers, San Diego Museum of Man, v.1-3  
 C. Michael Hogan (2008) Ring Mountain, The Megalithic Portal, ed. Andy Burnham 
 Greg White and Mark Basgall (1993) There Grows a Green Tree: Papers in Honor of David A. Fredrickson, Center for Archaeological Research at Davis, Center for Archaeological Research at Davis, California, 423 pages  

Petroglyphs
Rock art
Native American history of California
American Indian relics
History of Marin County, California
History of the San Francisco Bay Area